Dalvík is the main village of the Icelandic municipality of Dalvíkurbyggð. Its population is approximately 1,400.

The town's name means "valley bay."

Geography
Dalvík is on the western shore of Eyjafjörður in the valley of Svarfaðardalur.

Transportation
Dalvík harbor is a regional commercial port for import and fishing. The ferry Sæfari, which sails from Dalvík, serves the island of Grímsey, Iceland's northernmost community, which lies on the Arctic Circle. Bus services to Siglufjörður and Akureyri are provided by Strætó.

Culture
The annual Fiskidagurinn mikli is held the Saturday after the first Monday of August, attended by up to 30,000 people who enjoy a free fish buffet sponsored by the local fishing industry.
Dalvík has had four representatives at the Eurovision song contest for Iceland, despite its small size.

Sports
In sports, Dalvík is probably most known for alpine skiing. Böggvisstaðafjall is one of the best known ski areas in Iceland. The town has produced a series of skiers who have represented Iceland in the Olympics, World Cups, World Championships, and European Cups, as well as other international and national competitions. Amongst these have been Daníel Hilmarsson, Sveinn Brynjólfsson and Björgvin Björgvinsson.

Football teams from the village have had their ups and downs but have managed to produce some nationally known players; the most recognized one is former Cardiff City and Premier League forward Heiðar Helguson.

Hamar golf club has a 9-hole course, a short drive outside Dalvík.

Economy
The local economy is based upon fisheries and fish processing.

Dalvík is also a tourist destination for boat trips in whale watching and heli skiing.

Other information
The Dalvik process virtual machine in the Android operating system was named after this village. While the Dalvik virtual machine has been discontinued, replaced by Android Runtime in current versions of Android, .dex (Dalvik EXecutable) and .odex (Optimized Dalvik EXecutable) files are still used, so the Dalvik bytecode is still used for all Android apps.

References

External links

Dalvíkurbyggð municipality
Fiskidagur official site

 
Populated places in Northeastern Region (Iceland)